Segundo Oswaldo Jami (born 12 May 1986) is a long-distance runner from Ecuador. He competed in the marathon at the 2016 Olympics.

Jami comes from a family of athletes – his uncles José and Nestor competed in the marathon at the 2001 World Championships. Jami took up athletics around the year 2000. He has degrees in commerce and engineering from the University of the Armed Forces, Latacunga, Ecuador. He is married to Elina Chariguaman and has two children, Axel and Kimberly.

Personal Bests
5000m - 14:39.76 (2013)
10000m - 31:00.62 (2018)
Half Marathon - 1:03:31 (2018)
Marathon - 2:14:12 (2019)

References

1986 births
Living people
Ecuadorian male long-distance runners
Ecuadorian male marathon runners
Olympic athletes of Ecuador
Athletes (track and field) at the 2016 Summer Olympics
Athletes (track and field) at the 2018 South American Games
Athletes (track and field) at the 2019 Pan American Games
Pan American Games competitors for Ecuador